Trailer Town is a 2003 low-budget film shot on digital video, written and directed by Giuseppe Andrews and distributed by Troma Entertainment. The film is set in the trailer park where Andrews lives and stars many of the people who were his neighbors at the time. The film has drawn comparisons to the cult films of John Waters, Larry Clark, and Harmony Korine for its semi-realistic yet off-the-wall portrayal of lower-class individuals.

Giuseppe Andrews and Troma
Although it is not Andrews's first effort as a director—that would be Touch Me in the Morning, shot in 1999 and released by Troma Entertainment on DVD January 2006) -- Trailer Town is the first film Andrews directed to receive national distribution on DVD, through Troma. Andrews started a distribution relationship with Troma after his short film, Dribble, won the top prize at the 2004 Tromadance Film Festival in January 2004. Trailer Town and Dribble, included as part of The Best of Tromadance, Volume 3, were both released on DVD by Troma later in 2004. Troma has since released a number of Andrews's films and planned to release a box set with five previously-unreleased features in 2007. Before his deal with Troma, Andrews would distribute the movies himself, mostly through his website. While previously available for on-demand viewing and DVD rental on Netflix, as of August 2010 Trailer Town was no longer available through Netflix in either DVD or streaming format. As of July 2012 it has returned to Netflix in DVD format.

Cast members
Trailer Town includes cast members who are also featured in Dribble, not to mention the majority of Andrews's work as a director, namely: Bill Nowlin, Walt Dongo, Tyree, the late Gayle Wells, Sparky Sparks and Vietnam Ron. They were all neighbors of Andrews at the time of filming.

Sequels
Andrews created two sequels to Trailer Town. However, he destroyed them, and reportedly there are no more copies in existence. Andrews is known to have destroyed many of his works in this fashion when he gets dissatisfied with them.

References

External links
 
 Trailer Town on Troma

2003 films
2003 comedy-drama films
Troma Entertainment films
American comedy-drama films
2003 comedy films
2003 drama films
2000s English-language films
2000s American films